Tough love is the act of treating a person sternly or harshly with the intent to help them in the long run.

Description 
Bill Milliken described tough love through the expression, "I don't care how this makes you feel toward me. You may hate my guts, but I love you, and I am doing this because I love you."

Milliken strongly emphasizes that a relationship of care and love is a prerequisite of tough love, and that it requires that caregivers communicate clearly their love to the subject. Maia Szalavitz believes, based on her own experience, that this may be difficult, since some people experiencing addiction consider themselves unworthy of love and find it difficult to believe others love them.

In most uses, there must be some actual love or feeling of affection behind the harsh or stern treatment to be defined as tough love. For example, genuinely concerned parents refusing to support their drug-addicted child financially until he or she enters drug rehabilitation would be said to be practicing tough love.

Tim Hawkes has described tough love as putting "principles before popularity" and allowing loved ones to learn through failure.

Reception 
The term has been appropriated to justify authoritarian parenting and boot camps for teenagers which Maia Szalavitz characterizes as abusive. The National Institutes of Health noted that "get tough treatments do not work and there is some evidence that they may make the problem worse". Szalavitz believes tough love rhetoric encourages unnecessarily harsh rules, "brutal confrontations", and a presumption that pain produces growth.

The British think tank Demos asserts that tough love, understood as authoritative parenting in contrast to authoritarian parenting, is beneficial in the development of preferred character traits in children up to five years old.

History 
The phrase "tough love" itself is believed to have originated with Bill Milliken's book of the same title in 1968.

See also
Help at Any Cost: How the Troubled-Teen Industry Cons Parents and Hurts Kids
 Corporal punishment
 Troubled teen industry

Explanatory notes

Citations

General and cited references

External links

Love
English phrases
Behavior modification